How to Talk Minnesotan is a book by Howard Mohr, a former writer for A Prairie Home Companion. Published in 1987, the book provides examples of stereotypical Minnesotan speech and mannerisms. There was a musical version by Mohr and Drew Jansen (produced at Plymouth Playhouse by Troupe America, Inc.). The book was also adapted as a television special, which was produced by KTCA and first broadcast January 1, 1993.

Some of the things the book covers:
Useful phrases such as "You bet", "That's different", and "Whatever" 
Not accepting food until the third time it's offered
The art of waving
Hotdishes
Loons
Talking about cars and starting cars in the winter
The Minnesotan "long goodbye"

Much of the material for the book was originally performed as sketches on A Prairie Home Companion.  The book also includes fictional ads for improbable businesses such as "Raw Bits Cereal", "Polka Pants", and "Walleye Phone Company".

See also
North Central American English

External links
 How to Talk Minnesotan Twin Cities PBS video archive

References

Minnesota culture
Comedy books
Works about American English